Kal Kissne Dekha (contextually: Who knows what will happen tomorrow?) is an Indian Hindi-language romantic science fiction film directed by Vivek Sharma, who earlier directed Bhootnath. The film introduces debutantes Jackky Bhagnani and Vaishali Desai. It has been reported to have similarities with the 2007 Hollywood film Next, starring Nicolas Cage. Kal Kissne Dekha released on 12 June 2009. Upon release it received negative reviews.

Plot 
 
Nihal Singh is a teen from Chandigarh who loves to build complicated gadgets to learn what is behind science. He has a brilliant mind and dreams of studying at an elite science institute. When he is accepted into his dream college in Mumbai, he discovers college is a whole new world, new people and new challenges. At college Nihal is attracted to Meesha, a proud rude brat. She cannot accept that Nihal is managing to charm everyone his way including Professor Siddharth Verma, the warden of the college.

Nihal starts to get visions of Meesha being in danger. He saves her life and his secret is revealed that he can see the future. After this incident, love blossoms between Nihal and Meesha. Meanwhile, media exposure results in attention from anti-social elements, including an explosion at a mall. Nihal sees the explosion before it takes place and manages to rescue most people. It turns out one of Nihal's friend is behind the attack. Despite seeing the bomber, he keeps quiet and doesn't tell the police department. He strengthens up and decides to fight the attacker himself. At the end it was found that the attacker was none other than professor Siddharth Verma. He reached his house and after leaving from there he took car from there and ran to hotel where many people were residing. At last he got to know that bomb was planted in the car he took from professor house. In the end he saved the people from bomb blast and rather professor was killed in his own blast. The movie ends by nihal and meesha marriage, where media was interrupting them by asking whether they will have a boy or girl.

Cast 
 Jackky Bhagnani as Nihaal Singh
 Vaishali Desai as Meesha
 Akshay Kapoor as Kabir Ahuja
 Rishi Kapoor as Professor Sidharth Verma
 Nushrat Bharucha as Ria
 Ritesh Deshmukh as Kali Charan
 Archana Puran Singh as Bebe (Nihaal's mother)
 Satish Shah as Mr. Vinod Kapoor (Meesha's father)
 Rahul Dev as Marshal
 Vrajesh Hirjee as Police Inspector
 Farida Jalal as Maria
 Sanjay Dutt as DJ (special appearance)
 Juhi Chawla (special appearance)
 Rajpal Yadav as Jailor Of Central Jail
 Rachna Shah as Yana

Music 

The music was composed by Sajid–Wajid, with lyrics by Sameer. The music has gotten good reviews.

Production 
The film commenced shooting on 18 June 2008 in the University of the Witwatersrand in Johannesburg, South Africa. Durban, Cape Town, Stellenbosch (a town near Cape Town) and the University of Stellenbosch were the other locations. The prominent oaks in Stellenbosch can be clearly seen in many of the scenes. One of the dance numbers was shot in the university's library.

In March 2009, it was announced that Azharuddin Mohammed Ismail and Rubina Ali, two of the child stars of Slumdog Millionaire (2008), were cast in Kal Kissne Dekha.

References

External links 
 
 
 

2009 films
2000s Hindi-language films
2000s romance films
2009 science fiction films
Films directed by Vivek Sharma
Films set in Mumbai
Films set in universities and colleges
Films shot in KwaZulu-Natal
Films shot in Gauteng
Films shot in the Western Cape
Films about psychic powers
Indian science fiction films
Hindi films remade in other languages